James Farquhar (1 August 1764 – September 1833) was a Scottish politician in the 19th-century.

Political career 
In a 1802 by-election, he replaced Alexander Allardyce in Aberdeen Burghs in the first United Kingdom Parliament as an Independent. He was a supporter of the Liverpool ministry.

He lost his seat in the 1806 general election, but regained it at the 1807 general election. He was re-elected in 1812. He lost his seat in the 1818 general election to Radical candidate Joseph Hume.

In 1824, he became Tory MP for Portarlington in Ireland where he sat until 1830.

References 

1764 births
1833 deaths
19th-century Scottish politicians

Independent members of the House of Commons of the United Kingdom
Tory (British political party) politicians
UK MPs 1801–1802
UK MPs 1802–1806
UK MPs 1807–1812
UK MPs 1812–1818
UK MPs 1820–1826
UK MPs 1826–1830
Members of the Parliament of Great Britain for Scottish constituencies
Politicians from Aberdeen
Members of the Parliament of the United Kingdom for Aberdeen constituencies
People from Portarlington, County Laois